The Brittany national football team is the representative football team of Brittany, France. It is administered by the Breton Football Association (BFA). It is neither affiliated to FIFA nor UEFA but is characterised as one of the six Celtic nations. Its games are held under the auspices of the French Football Federation and FIFA Regulations Amateur football in Brittany is administered by both the Ligue de Bretagne and the Ligue Atlantique, which are regional associations within the French FA.

Squad selection

Brittany plays unofficial internationals. Eligibility to play for the Breton team is strict, as the players (or their parents or grandparents) must have been born within the Breton territory. The BFA has a pool of around 100 players in the first three professional divisions to choose from, some of them with proven international football experience. Those who have played for the Betron side include the likes of Christian Gourcuff, Paul Le Guen, Yann Kermorgant. Brittany's Stéphane Guivarc'h won the 1998 World Cup with France.

History
Given their strong sense of cultural separatism from the rest of France, Brittany formed a Breton XI football team, that competed at various points throughout the 20th century, playing against the likes of Luxembourg and Norway. The Breton team made their debut at the Roazhon Park in Rennes in 1922, defeating Luxembourg 1-0.

The Breton Football Association (BFA) was formalized on 18 July 1997, and shortly after they brought together Breton professional footballers to form a representative football team of Brittany. Following the support from Fernand Sastre and Michel Platini (co-presidents of the French Organizing Committee for the 1998 World Cup), the Brittany team was set up with the aim to offer a warm-up game to the 1998 WC qualified national teams, and therefore, they played their first official game against Cameroon on 21 May 1998 (two weeks before the start of the tournament) at Roazhon Park in Rennes, and a Breton side featuring Paul Le Guen surprised, as they notably hold the Cameroonian to a 1-1 draw, thanks to an equalizing goal from Guingampais Rouxel just before the break. Six games had to be called off between 1999 and 2005 because of the then French FA administration, which contradicted its own rules. The head of the French FA administration changed and BFA finally recovered in order to fully resume its activities in 2008. Two years later, in 2010, Brittany participated in the 2010 Corsica Football Cup, where they were knocked out in the semi-finals by the hosts and eventual champions, Corcisa, however, they managed to salvage same pride by defeating Togo in the third place match. Its latest game was played versus Mali (1–0) on 28 May 2013.

Celtic Cup Ambitions

BFA offered other Celtic nations to join in a Celtic Nations Championship between 1985 and 1987. On 9 September 1985, BFA Secretary Fañch Gaume, visiting Cardiff on the eve of a World Cup qualifier between Wales and Scotland, sounded both the FA of Wales and the Scottish FA about participation to a Celtic Nations Cup. Informal conversations were followed up by correspondence and further personal exchanges, whenever the opportunity presented itself before international games.

While Wales showed a genuine interest, the offer finally fell on barren ground with Scotland. Rejection letters from the SFA for non-entry stated the difficulties to find suitable dates but, as the sports editor of "The Glasgow Herald" Jim Reynolds presented it: "It is just two years since England and Scotland broke up the British International Championship by calling a halt to regular games featuring Northern Ireland and Wales. So, the chances of a Celtic Championship involving Scotland must be remote."

Brittany recently renewed its claims to organise and take part in the new Celtic Nations Cup with the Republic of Ireland, Scotland and Wales by 2015 at the earliest or 2017.

Internationals

° game agreed but not played because of then French FA administration (1999–2005).

Managers
 1988: Jean-Louis Lamour and Marc Rastoll
 1998: Georges Eo and René Le Lamer
 2000/2008: Serge Le Dizet
 2010: Philippe Bergeroo
 2011: Michel Audrain
 2014: Jacques Santini
 2016: Raymond Domenech and Michel Audrain

Capped Players

To be included in the Breton squad, according to FIFA national teams rules, it is eligible a player: 
- born into one of five historical Breton departments. 
- with parents from Brittany.
- with grandparents from Brittany 
- grown up in Brittany since the age of seven. 

Opponents: Cm (Cameroon), Cg (Republic of Congo), Cs (Corsica), Gq (Equatorial Guinea), Oi (Nantes 'Ouest Indoor' Tournament), Tg (Togo), Us (USA).

Last-minute defections through injury or illness:
1998: Sylvain Ripoll, Ronan Salaün
2000: Claude Michel
2008: Mathieu Bouyer, Romain Danzé, Yoann Gourcuff, Fabien Lemoine
2010: Hassan Ahamada, Étienne Didot, Jérémy Menez, Fabien Robert
2011: Florent Besnard, Mathieu Bouyer

Notable players 

Breton footballers who represented FIFA national teams

Men's internationals
 Players in bold have won the FIFA World Cup
 Players in underlined have won a continental championships

Women's internationals

Image gallery

Notes and references

External links
Official website of Football Association of Brittany

National team
European national and official selection-teams not affiliated to FIFA
Football teams in France